Avondale Park is a 1.7 acre park in the Avondale community area of North Side, Chicago, Illinois. 

The park stretches between School Street to the south to the Kennedy Expressway to the north and east, with the alley behind Drake Street to the West. The park has recreational facilities including a playground, a fieldhouse, as well as an outdoor pool.

History
Created by the Irving Park District, Avondale Park takes its name from the surrounding neighborhood of Avondale. In 1929, the Irving Park District board drew up plans for a 5 acre park. That year an attractive brick fieldhouse designed by Clarence Hatzfeld was built, and lawn, shrubbery, trees, and flowers soon graced Avondale Park's landscape. By the early 1930s, the park included a playfield, separate boys' and girls' playgrounds, a wading pool, a sand box, and tennis courts.

With the creation of the Chicago Park District in 1934, the Great Depression forced consolidation of the city's 22 independent park agencies, including the Irving Park District. 

In 1959 the park's size was greatly reduced to just over 1 acre, when its entire northeast portion was destroyed to build the Kennedy Expressway. The result was the loss of Avondale Park's playfield and tennis courts, with the site redesigned to incorporate new volleyball and basketball courts. 

Parks in Chicago
North Side, Chicago
1929 establishments in Illinois